Ronald Field Atkinson (1928 - 17 April 2005) was a British philosopher and Professor of Philosophy at the University of Exeter and University of York.

Books
 Sexual Morality (1965)
 Conduct: An Introduction to Moral Philosophy (1969)
 Knowledge and Explanation in History: An Introduction to the Philosophy of History (1978)

References

20th-century British philosophers
Philosophy academics
2005 deaths
1928 births
Alumni of Keble College, Oxford
Academics of Keele University
Philosophers of history